Etamine is a loosely woven fabric with a similar structure to voile or a mesh. It is an open fabric structure manufactured with plain weaving by using hardly twisted cotton or wool yarns. There were further variations including various fibres such as silk. Etamine was initially used as filter cloth, but became popular in women's skirts from 1910. Etamine was used in a variety of applications, including garments, nun's veils, and even flags.

Etymology 
The word , which means sieve, is a borrowed word from French language.

See also 
 Sheer fabric

References 

Woven fabrics